The Handheld Device Markup Language (HDML) is a markup language intended for display on handheld computers, information appliances, smartphones, etc.. It is similar to HTML, but for wireless and handheld devices with small displays, like PDA, mobile phones and so on.  

It was originally developed in about 1996 by Unwired Planet, the company that became Phone.com and then Openwave.  HDML was submitted to W3C for standardization, but was not turned into a standard.  Instead it became an important influence on the development and standardization of WML, which then replaced HDML in practice. Unlike WML, HDML has no support for scripts.

See also
Wireless Application Protocol
List of document markup languages
Comparison of document markup languages

References 

Markup languages
Computer-related introductions in 1996
Mobile web